William, Bill, or Billy Knight may refer to:

Arts and entertainment
 William Frederick Knight (1933–2022), voice actor
 William Henry Knight (1823–1863), British painter

Politics
 William Knight (died 1622), Member of Parliament (MP) for Hythe
 Bill Knight (born 1947), former Canadian Member of Parliament and financial executive
 William J. Knight (1929–2004), X-15 pilot and U.S. politician
 William W. Knight (politician) (1913–?), Pennsylvania politician
 William Knight (Wisconsin politician) (1843–1941), Wisconsin legislator and orchardman
 William Grills Knight (1839–1903), mayor of Albany, Western Australia

Sports
 William Knight (fighter) (born 1988), American mixed martial arts (MMA) fighter
 Billy Knight (basketball, born 1979) (1979–2018), American basketball player who went to college at UCLA
 William Knight (volleyball) (born 1964), Canadian volleyball player
 Billy Knight (born 1952), American basketball player and executive in the NBA who went to college at Pittsburgh
 Bill Knight (boxer) (born 1951), British Olympic boxer
 Billy Knight (tennis) (born 1935), British tennis player
 William Knight (footballer), English football goalkeeper for Southampton (1911–1913)

Others
 William Angus Knight (1836–1916), British writer, professor, and philosopher
 William Bruce Knight (1786–1845), Dean of Llandaff
 William Knight (architect) (1840-1923), architect in Nottingham
 William Knight (pirate), English buccaneer
 William Knight (martyr) (1572–1596), martyred in 1596
 William Knight (bishop) (1475–1547), member of the court of Henry VIII, and Bishop of Bath and Wells
 William W. Knight (publisher) (1909–1981), lawyer, state legislator, publisher of The Oregon Journal
 William James Knight, American soldier and Medal of Honor recipient

See also

 
 William C. Knights (1917–1973), New York assemblyman
 William Nye (disambiguation)
 Bill Nigh (disambiguation)